Roza Erdemli (born 15 January 2001) is a Turkish swimmer. She competed in the women's 200 metre butterfly event at the 2018 FINA World Swimming Championships (25 m), in Hangzhou, China. She also competed in the women's 4 × 50 metre freestyle relay and women's 4 × 100 metre freestyle relay events.

References

External links
 

2001 births
Living people
Turkish female swimmers
Turkish female butterfly swimmers
Place of birth missing (living people)
Turkish female freestyle swimmers
21st-century Turkish sportswomen